Nyma Tang is an American beauty vlogger and activist against discrimination based on skin color and best known for her Youtube channel of the same name. She gained online popularity in 2017 for her YouTube series The Darkest Shade, in which she reviews the darkest shades of products from different makeup brands and highlights the under-representation of deeper skin tones in the beauty industry.

Early life 
Tang was born in Ethiopia to South Sudanese parents; her native language is Nuer. She is the oldest of seven sisters and her family moved to the US when she was three years old. She has spoken openly about her experiences of bullying at school due to her skin colour. She started training as a nurse before dropping out at 21 to become a full time beauty vlogger.

Career 
Tang's interest in makeup was sparked after watching America's Next Top Model, where she saw Black women models being publicly celebrated for this first time. She started her Youtube channel when she was 25 years old and in 2017, she began recording the series The Darkest Shade, in which she reviews the darkest shades of products from different makeup brands. She uses this series and her platform to help women with darker skin tones find good matches in various makeup products, to educate people about colourism and to lobby cosmetics brands to make more inclusive shade ranges. On her channel, she has also shared her experiences with natural hair.

In 2018, Tang created her own shade of MAC Cosmetics lipstick called 'Nyma Tang'. She has collaborated on sponsored content with brands like Fenty Beauty, Bobbi Brown and Pat McGrath.

Awards

References

External links
The Darkest Shade YouTube

Living people
African-American people
Beauty and makeup YouTubers
YouTube vloggers
Ethiopian expatriates in the United States
American people of Sudanese descent
American people of South Sudanese descent
Activists from Texas
People from Dallas
Shorty Award winners
Year of birth missing (living people)
21st-century American women